Zoveyr-e Chari (also Romanized as Zoveyr-e Charī, Zoveyr-e Cherī, and Zovairé Cheri) is a village in Mollasani Rural District, in the Central District of Bavi County, Khuzestan Province, Iran. At the 2006 census, its population was 267, in 49 families.

References 

Populated places in Bavi County